Gaylord City Park is a city park in Gaylord, Minnesota, United States, on the south shore of Lake Titlow.  First established in 1897, the park grounds contain a 1916 dance pavilion, 1940 bandshell, and a 1940 bridge built by the Works Progress Administration. The historic core of the park was listed on the National Register of Historic Places in 2012 for its local significance in the theme of entertainment/recreation.  It was nominated for its long-serving importance as a community gathering space, hosting concerts, festivals, sporting events, circuses, speeches, and family picnics.

The park is part of the Gaylord City Park System and is overseen by the Park & Recreation Board of the city's Board of Directors.

See also
 National Register of Historic Places listings in Sibley County, Minnesota

References

External links

 Gaylord City Parks

1897 establishments in Minnesota
National Register of Historic Places in Sibley County, Minnesota
Parks on the National Register of Historic Places in Minnesota
Protected areas established in 1897
Works Progress Administration in Minnesota